John Belton is Professor Emeritus of English and Film at Rutgers University. He is editor of the Film and Culture series at Columbia University Press and associate editor of SMPTE's Motion Imaging Journal. He earned his PhD from Harvard University and specializes in film history and cultural studies. Belton has served on the National Film Preservation Board, as chair of the Board of Editors of the Society of Motion Picture and Television Engineers, and authored numerous books. In 2005/2006, he was granted a Guggenheim Fellowship to pursue his study of the use of digital technology in the film industry.

Publications

Alfred Hitchcock's Rear Window
Alfred Hitchcock's film Rear Window (1954) is a thriller starring James Stewart as Jeffries, an action-seeking photographer who is chair-ridden due to his fast-paced career, and Grace Kelly as Lisa Carol Fremont, Jeffries' ritzy, high-fashion love interest. Jeffries' boredom forces him to spy on his neighbors all day and night, which leads him and Lisa to find themselves in the middle of a shifty scandal suspecting their neighbor to be a murderer.

In his book, Alfred Hitchcock's Rear Window, Belton addresses the underlying issues of voyeurism, scopophilia, patriarchy, and feminism that are evident in the film. He states: "Rear Window's story is 'about' spectacle; it explores the fascination with looking and the attraction of that which is being looked at." Generally, Belton's book proves that there is more to Hitchcock's thriller than what initially meets the eye. These issues that society faces today are all more than just present in the film; they are emphasized and strengthened.

References

Living people
Year of birth missing (living people)
Harvard University alumni
Rutgers University faculty
American academics of English literature